Hornsea Town may refer to:
Hornsea Town railway station, former station in East Riding of Yorkshire, England
Hornsea Town Football Club, club playing in Humber Premier League

See also
Hornsea, town and civil parish in East Riding of Yorkshire